David Barry Kitson (born 21 January 1980) is an English former professional footballer who played as a forward. He made 420 appearances in the Premier League and Football League, including 135 for Reading.

Kitson began his career with non-League Hitchin Town and Arlesey Town before he joined Cambridge United in 2001 and became one of the brightest prospects in the Third Division which led to him being signed by Reading in 2003 for a fee of £150,000. He enjoyed great success with the "Royals", forming a formidable partnership with Kevin Doyle as Reading gained promotion to the Premier League in 2006. After two seasons in the top flight Reading were relegated and Kitson signed for newcomers Stoke City for a club record fee of £5.5 million.

However, his career soon started to become sour and, after failing to score a single goal, he was loaned back to Reading. He began the 2009–10 season better, scoring twice, but was then loaned out again this time to Middlesbrough. He returned to Stoke in January 2010 but continued to struggle and, after manager Tony Pulis branded him 'petulant', he was allowed to join Portsmouth as part of a swap deal for Marc Wilson. He spent two seasons at Fratton Park but agreed to cancel his contract with Portsmouth in August 2012 with the club in danger of being liquidated, and subsequently joined Sheffield United on a short-term deal, before signing a two-year contract at Oxford United in June 2013.

Early life
Born in Hitchin, Hertfordshire, Kitson spent his early career in non-League football with Hitchin Town and Arlesey Town. His day job was working at national supermarket chain Sainsbury's as a frozen food stacker.

Club career

Cambridge United
Kitson joined Cambridge United, then in Division Two, in 2001 after being recommended by agent Barry Silkman to U's manager John Beck. He made his debut in 3–2 victory away over Stoke City on 17 March 2001. On the final day of the same season, Kitson notched his first goal for the club in a 1–1 draw at Swansea City. The following season saw the club relegated from League One but Kitson scored 10 goals, finishing as the club's second-top goalscorer, one behind Tom Youngs. It was in the 2002–03 campaign that Kitson really found his feet. He scored 25 goals in a prolific campaign which saw him hot on the heels of David Crown's club record of 27 goals in a season. After 11 goals in 19 appearances at the start of the 2003–04 season, Kitson left Cambridge to join second-tier outfit Reading. His return of 47 goals in 123 appearances in all competitions ensured Kitson's place among the club's all-time legends.

Reading
Kitson was sold to Reading on 26 December 2003, for a fee of £150,000. At Reading, he scored five goals in 10 starts in his first season. In the 2005–06 season, despite injury he went on to record an impressive goals-to-game ratio, and continued to do so as Reading won the Championship title.

Following promotion with Reading, Kitson scored the club's first Premier League goal in their 3–2 home win against Middlesbrough on the opening day of the 2006–07 season, but was then badly injured later in the same match. The injury kept him out of the game until Reading's FA Cup victory over Birmingham City on 27 January 2007. On 27 March, he committed his future to Reading, signing a new deal that would expire in June 2010.

At the start of 2007–08, he was sent off less than a minute after coming on as a substitute for Reading against Manchester United, for a late challenge on Patrice Evra. In January 2008 he made some controversial comments regarding the FA Cup, saying "We are not going to win the FA Cup and I do not care less about it, to be honest."

Stoke City
On 18 July 2008, Kitson moved in a £5.5m move from Reading to Stoke City, breaking Stoke's record transfer fee.

However,  before long speculation arose as to whether Kitson was settled or not as he struggled to adapt to Stoke's style of play after being played out of position by manager Tony Pulis. As a result, he failed to score any goals in any of the 18 competitive games he played for Stoke City in the 2008–09 season. Chairman Peter Coates and Pulis both denied any rumour that he might be leaving the Britannia Stadium. The Stoke City board reacted to this growing disquiet, and he rejoined Reading on loan until the end of the 2008–09 season on 10 March 2009.

Kitson later revealed that he made the "wrong decision" in joining Stoke, adding that he and his family were happy at Reading and that "I threw all of that away for what I thought was going to be a new challenge... I hold my hands up – it was my fault. I made the decision to go to Stoke, I didn't have to, no-one forced me to go, and it was a bad decision." With regards to his failure to score for Stoke, he said "I'd been bought for a lot of money but I wasn't sure I was being utilised in the way I thought I was going to be... You do have some days at training when you go back in and wonder what you're doing there."

However, Reading failed to gain promotion, meaning that Kitson returned to Stoke. Kitson stated that he would "start his Stoke career again". His first competitive goal for Stoke came in a 1–0 League Cup win at Leyton Orient on 26 August 2009. He scored his first league goal for Stoke on 29 August 2009, which proved to be the winning goal against Sunderland and then scored again with a goal against Bolton Wanderers. However Kitson lost his place to James Beattie and joined Middlesbrough on a two-month loan. He scored his first goals for Middlesbrough when he scored a brace against Peterborough United on 28 November 2009. He returned to Stoke on 1 January 2010. He scored in the FA Cup against Manchester City and against Bolton. However, after a poor performance against Chelsea he never played for Stoke again and was branded as 'petulant' by manager Pulis.

Portsmouth

Kitson was announced as a Portsmouth player alongside Liam Lawrence on deadline day as part of a deal which took Marc Wilson to Stoke City. Kitson made his Portsmouth debut on 11 September 2010 in a 0–0 draw with Ipswich at Fratton Park. He scored his first goal for the club in a 4–1 defeat at Crystal Palace on 14 September 2010 and a further 2 goals in a 6–1 win over Leicester at Fratton Park on 24 September 2010. In his first season, Kitson made 39 appearances and scored 8 goals.

In his second season, along with Rocha, Kitson was frequently omitted from the squad before manager Steve Cotterill left to become manager of Nottingham Forest. Kitson claimed "the team are more united" after Cotterill's departure. Kitson experienced a dip in form and was dropped to the bench by Cotterill's successor, Michael Appleton. After some criticism by the fans and media Kitson scored his first Pompey goal since October 2011 when he scored away at Doncaster Rovers in the 90th minute with his hands to equalise; Márkó Futács scored minutes later to win the game for Pompey 4–3. This defeat kept Portsmouth in the division for another week at least and sent Doncaster down. Kitson agreed to leave the club in August 2012.

Sheffield United
On 31 August 2012, Kitson joined Sheffield United on a short-term deal, due to run until the end of December. He made his debut on 15 September 2012, coming on as a second-half substitute in the 1–1 draw with Bury. His first goal for the Blades came in a 1–1 draw against Notts County at Bramall Lane on 29 September 2012. On 16 November 2012 Kitson extended his contract until the end of the season, stating that "It wouldn't have sat comfortably with me to leave a job half done after integrating myself into a great squad... I still would like to go to America but we will revisit that at a later date because the aim is to have a good crack at winning promotion here." Kitson played regularly for the remainder of the season, making 37 appearances in total and scoring eleven goals, but with the Blades failing to gain promotion he was released when his contract expired in June 2013.

Oxford United
On 27 June 2013, Kitson joined League Two club Oxford United, signing a two-year contract. He scored four league goals in his only season at the club. On 22 July 2014 Kitson announced his decision to retire from playing professional football.

Return to Arlesey Town
On 15 December 2014, Kitson was appointed player-assistant manager to new boss Nick Ironton at Arlesey Town, the club he played for between 2000 and 2001. However, Kitson departed the club in February 2015, after the departure of Ironton.

Personal life
On 9 January 2008, Kitson was stopped by police whilst driving late at night near his home in Shinfield, Berkshire and was charged with failing to provide a breath sample. He appeared at Reading Magistrates' Court on 18 January 2008, and received an 18-month driving ban, a £1000 fine and was ordered to pay £60 costs. In December 2018, Kitson caused controversy for comments he made on Talksport radio, where he claimed that the reason Raheem Sterling had been subjected to racial abuse was because he had incited "jealousy" with his "luxury lifestyle". Kitson received widespread criticism for these views, including live on air from the show's host, and AFC Bournemouth defender Tyrone Mings who was due to go on air pulled out as a result.

Career statistics

Honours
Reading
Football League Championship: 2005–06

Individual
PFA Team of the Year: 2002–03 Third Division

References

External links

1980 births
Living people
Sportspeople from Hitchin
People educated at Fearnhill School
English footballers
Association football forwards
Hitchin Town F.C. players
Arlesey Town F.C. players
Cambridge United F.C. players
Reading F.C. players
Stoke City F.C. players
Middlesbrough F.C. players
Portsmouth F.C. players
Sheffield United F.C. players
Oxford United F.C. players
Premier League players
English Football League players
Isthmian League players